Peter Elliott (born 9 October 1962 in Rotherham, Yorkshire) is a former middle-distance runner from the United Kingdom. During his career, he won the gold medal in the 1500 metres at the 1990 Commonwealth Games, the silver medal in the 1500 metres at the 1988 Olympic Games, and the silver medal in the 800 metres at the 1987 World Championships.

Biography

Elliott was brought up in Rawmarsh, near Rotherham, in the then West Riding of Yorkshire. He attended Rawmarsh Comprehensive School and later worked as a joiner at British Steel Corporation. He managed to establish himself as a world class athlete while working full-time. He began his athletic career by running in the Young Athletes League for his local club, Rotherham Harriers, and his 800m time of 1 minute 53.3 seconds has been the under-17 record since 1979. He also held the UK under-17 record with a time of 1 minute 50.7 seconds, which stood for nearly 10 years. He excelled as a schoolboy athlete, winning four English Schools titles, twice at 800 metres and twice over the country.

In August 1982, he set a 4 × 800 metres relay World Record of 7 minutes 3.89 seconds with fellow British athletes Sebastian Coe, Steve Cram and Garry Cook. At the 1983 World Championships held in Helsinki, he finished 4th in the 800m final.

Elliott was not selected for the 1500m at the 1984 Olympic Games in Los Angeles, losing out to the eventual gold and silver medallists, Sebastian Coe and Steve Cram, and the then world record holder, Steve Ovett. At the time, it was a very controversial decision. After Ovett and Cram had secured their places, the third place was either Coe's or Elliott's. Although Elliott defeated Coe at the AAA's Championships, the selectors opted for Coe. Elliott was selected for the 800m and qualified for the semi-finals, but had to withdraw due to an injury.

Elliott won a bronze medal in the 800m at the 1986 Commonwealth Games in Edinburgh behind Steve Cram and Tom McKean. He then won a silver medal in the event at the 1987 World Championships in Rome. The following year, he won the silver medal in the 1500m at the Olympic Games in Seoul. He also finished fourth in the Olympic 800m final. In January 1990, he became the Commonwealth champion over 1500m in Auckland. Later in the year, he ran 1:42.97 over 800m in Seville (ranking him No. 1 in the world for 1990, and making him the third fastest Briton of all time over the distance). This made him the favourite to win both middle distance gold medals at the 1990 European Championships in Split. However, due to injury problems he only entered for the 1500m and was tripped in the semi-final. After an appeal by the British team he was reinstated (against his own wishes and those of some other athletes), and went on to finish fourth in the final. A year later, he defeated the European champion Jens-Peter Herold in the 1500m race at the European Cup in Frankfurt. He also won the Fifth Avenue Mile in 1987, 1989 and 1990, the latter in 3:47.83 min.

After retiring from competition running in 1992, Elliott became a coach and race organiser. He joined Newcastle-based sports marketing agency Nova International, where he was Director of Running. In 2004 he became the  Athlete Services Manager for Yorkshire at the English Institute of Sport in Sheffield.

Personal bests

References
UK Athletics Hall of Fame 
 UKA Young Athletes League
 Peter Elliott: Rotherham Harriers & AC Roll of Honour
Power of 10 Profile: Peter Elliott

1962 births
Living people
People from Rawmarsh
English male middle-distance runners
Olympic athletes of Great Britain
Olympic silver medallists for Great Britain
Athletes (track and field) at the 1984 Summer Olympics
Athletes (track and field) at the 1988 Summer Olympics
Commonwealth Games medallists in athletics
Commonwealth Games gold medallists for England
Commonwealth Games bronze medallists for England
Athletes (track and field) at the 1986 Commonwealth Games
Athletes (track and field) at the 1990 Commonwealth Games
World Athletics Championships athletes for Great Britain
World Athletics Championships medalists
Athletes from Yorkshire
Medalists at the 1988 Summer Olympics
Olympic silver medalists in athletics (track and field)
Medallists at the 1986 Commonwealth Games
Medallists at the 1990 Commonwealth Games